Huang Jie (born 19 January 1993) is a Taiwanese politician and a former member of the New Power Party. She was elected to the Kaohsiung City Council in 2018, representing Fongshan District. Huang is known for questioning the policies of former Kaohsiung mayor Han Kuo-yu.

Early life
Huang graduated from Kaohsiung Municipal Kaohsiung Girls' Senior High School and attended National Taiwan University, where she received a degree in public health and sociology.  After graduating, she was admitted to the graduate program at the Institute of Environmental Health at National Taiwan University, but soon took leave of the program to be a journalist and later a legislative assistant for the New Power Party.  After returning to the program and taking a second leave of absence, she returned to Fongshan to run for city council.

Kaohsiung City Council 

Huang is known for criticizing Han Kuo-yu's plan to establish a free economic zone in Kaohsiung in a viral video where she rolled her eyes after Han seemed unable or unwilling to give details about his plan.  She left the New Power Party on August 26, 2020.

On February 6, 2021, she faced an unsuccessful Kuomintang-led recall attempt, with 65,256 voting against the recall versus 55,394 voting in favor and a 41.54% turnout; furthermore the number of votes in favor of the recall did not meet the required threshold of 25% of eligible voters, or 72,892 votes.  The recall attempt was viewed by Huang's supporters as retaliation for her role in the successful recall of former mayor Han Kuo-yu.

References

External links
 
 

1993 births
Living people
Kaohsiung City Councilors
National Taiwan University alumni
Taiwanese LGBT politicians
21st-century Taiwanese women politicians
21st-century Taiwanese politicians
New Power Party politicians
Women local politicians in Taiwan